The GCC Champions League, is an annually organized football league tournament for club of the Arabian Peninsula.

The 2008 edition was the 24th time that it has been organised.

Participating clubs

 Al-Najma
 Al Muharraq
 Al Qadsia
 Al Salmiya
 Al-Nahda
 Dhofar
 Al Khor
 Al-Ahli
 Al-Nassr

Clubs withdrawn

 Umm-Salal Sports Club, withdrew
 UAE representatives not entered
 Iraq representatives not entered

Group A

Final Standings

Group B
Final Standings

Semi-finals

1st Legs

2nd Legs

 1 The Kuwaiti clubs' matches canceled due to FIFA's freezing of the membership of the Kuwait Football Association. Therefore the second leg clash between the Kuwaiti sides was annulled and the other semi-final involving club sides from Saudi Arabia was promoted to be played as the final.

Final

Winner

References

External links
RSSSF

GCC Champions League
Gulf Club Champions Cup, 2008